The Order of the Quetzal (Spanish: Orden del Quetzal) is Guatemala’s highest honor.

History and award conditions 
Established in 1936, it is bestowed by the Government of Guatemala.  The award acknowledges officials of nations, organizations and other entities whose artistic, civic, humanitarian, or scientific works merit special recognition.

Grades 
 Collar: Golden chain around the neck
 Grand Cross: Badge hanging from a sash from right shoulder to left hip and star on the left chest
 Grand Officer: Badge hanging from a sash around the neck and non-enamelled star on the left chest.
 Commander: Badge hanging from a sash around the neck 
 Officer: Badge hanging from a ribbon with rosette on the left chest
 Knight: Badge hanging from a ribbon without rosette on the left chest. The badge is not golden.

Insignia 
The badge is a ten-pointed cross with five branches and a medallion representing the coat of arms of Guatemala. The branches are light blue with a wide dark blue border. On the white ring is inscribed "AL MERITO GUATEMALA". The ribbon is light blue with thin white borders.

Recipients

References
 World Medals Index - Guatemala: Order of the Quetzal

 
Orders, decorations, and medals of Guatemala
Quetzal, Order of the
Awards established in 1936
1936 establishments in Guatemala